Mermaid of Naples is a 1956 Italian musical melodrama film directed by Luigi Capuano.

Plot

Cast 

Marisa Allasio: Maruzzella
Massimo Serato: Salvatore
Yvette Lebon: Donna Carmela
Adolfo Geri: Caputo
Renato Carosone: Renato
Carlo Tamberlani: Don Mario
Virginia Balistrieri: Aunt Concetta

See also    
 List of Italian films of 1956

References

External links

1956 films
1950s romantic musical films
Italian musical drama films
Italian romantic drama films
Films directed by Luigi Capuano
Films set in Naples
1950s Italian films
Melodrama films